The Movement for Piedmontese Regional Autonomy (Movimento per l'Autonomia Regionale Piemontese, MARP) was a regionalist political party active in Piedmont, Italy. It was one of the precursors of Autonomist Piedmont and, thus, Lega Nord.

The MARP was founded in 1955 in Turin by a group of Piedmontese autonomists led by professor Enrico Villarboito. It was originally conceived as a trans-party organization aimed at fighting for Piedmontese regional autonomy within Italian unity, according to the Constitution of Italy. As such, it was open to people from all political parties and backgrounds. However, the MARP became soon a party among parties. In 1956 it was the fifth most voted party in Turin, electing four municipal councillors, and elected a councillor also to the provincial council. The party was soon disbanded, but was a model for many regionalist parties in Northern Italy.

References

Political parties in Piedmont
Political parties established in 1955
1955 establishments in Italy